Delias putih  is a butterfly in the family Pieridae. It was described by Henricus Jacobus Gerardus van Mastrigt in 1996. It is found in the Indomalayan realm.

Subspecies
Delias albertisi putih (Papua)
Delias albertisi tamamitsui Morita, 1996 (Papua)

References

External links
Delias at Markku Savela's Lepidoptera and Some Other Life Forms

putih
Butterflies described in 1995